Sovereign Hill is an open-air museum in Golden Point, a suburb of Ballarat, Victoria, Australia.  Sovereign Hill depicts Ballarat's first ten years after the discovery of gold there in 1851. It was officially opened on 29 November 1970 and has become a nationally acclaimed tourist attraction. It is one of Victoria's most popular attractions and Ballarat's most famous.

Set in the Australian 1850s, the complex is located on a 25-hectare site that is linked to the richest alluvial gold rush in the world. The site comprises over 60 historically recreated buildings, with costumed staff and volunteers, who are able to answer questions and will pose for photos. The recreation is completed with antiques, artwork, books and papers, machinery, livestock and animals, carriages, and devices all appropriate to the era.

History
The second-largest gold nugget in the world was found in Ballarat in the Red Hill Mine which is recreated in Sovereign Hill. The Welcome Nugget weighed 69 kg,(2,200 ounces) and comprised 99.2% pure gold, valued at about 10,596 pounds when found, and worth over US$3 million in gold now, or far more as a specimen.

The idea of Sovereign Hill was floated in Ballarat in the 1960s, as a way to preserve historic buildings and to recreate the gold diggings that made the city. The complex was officially opened to the public on 29 November 1970.

Main street is a loose reconstruction of Main Street, Ballarat East which was once the settlement's main street, consisting of timber buildings. It was consumed in a large fire during the 1860s and a more substantial town centre planned around Sturt and Lydiard Street in Ballarat West.

Attractions

The gold diggings are the centre point of the complex, featuring a winding creek in which visitors are able to pan for real gold. This area is surrounded by tents and buildings contemporary to the early years of the gold rush. A recent addition to Sovereign Hill is the Gold Pour where pure gold valued at over $100,000 is melted and poured into a three-kilogram bullion bar.

There are two mines which have guided tours at regular intervals. The Red Hill Mine is a self-guided tour that tells the story of a group of Cornishmen and their discovery of the Welcome Nugget. The Sovereign Quartz Mine runs 40-minute guided tours and features several underground displays. Above ground it also features steam-driven machinery for pumping water and processing the ore.  More recently an attraction titled "Trapped" has been added. This exhibit, which is set in series of above-ground concrete structures designed to look like tunnels from within, tells the story of the New Australasian Gold Mine disaster at Creswick in 1882. Twenty-two miners died because of the collapse and flooding of the New Australasian No. 2 Mine. This is still considered one of Australia's worst mining disasters. Australia's worst mining disaster was the Mount Keira Mine Disaster in 1902 which killed 96 workers.

Main Street is lined with shops, two hotels and a theatre. There is a blacksmith's workshop, stables, photography studio, apothecary, bakery, jeweller's shop, grocer, tentmaker, tinsmith, bank, post office, candle-dipping shop, lolly shop, nine-pin bowling saloon and library. Behind Main Street there are a number of period cottages which are open for visitors. There are also four schools where children in school-groups dress in period costume and attend as a child of the 1850s. 

A number of workshops at Sovereign Hill display traditional trades such as coachbuilder, wheelwright, tinsmith, blacksmith and farrier.

AURA is a son et lumiere show depicting the story of gold. It is run at night for a length of 90 minutes, using only sound and lights.

Mine tram
The Sovereign Hill mine tram, opened in March 2008, is an inclined tramway that takes tourists into the mine for a tour. Each tram is 1.35 metres wide and 1.55 metres high, and can carry 33 passengers. The tram goes through a flap, and enters a dark tunnel.

Stations
The Sovereign Hill mine tram has 3 stations – the top station, and two bottom stations. The two bottom stations are located in the mine, and the top station is located in a small hut, which has 2 platforms and a tram per platform. The two bottom stations only has a single platform, as each mine tram goes to a different section.

See also
 Chilean mill, a replica of which has been constructed at Sovereign Hill open-air museum in Ballarat.

References

Bibliography
 Frost, W (2005) Making an edgier interpretation of the Gold Rushes: contrasting perspectives from Australia and New Zealand. International Journal of Heritage Studies, 11 (3), pp. 235–250.
 Evans, M (1991) Historical interpretation at Sovereign Hill. Australian Historical Studies 24 (96), pp. 142–152.

External links

 

1970 establishments in Australia
History of Ballarat
Gold mining in Australia
Living museums in Australia
Mining museums in Australia
Museums established in 1970
Open-air museums in Australia
Tourist attractions in Ballarat
Museums in Ballarat